Anger is a municipality in the district of Weiz in the Austrian state of Styria.

Geography
Anger lies about 40 km northeast of Graz, 13 km northeast of Weiz, and 10 km south of Birkfeld.

References

Cities and towns in Weiz District